Imoh Ezekiel (born 24 October 1993) is a Nigerian footballer who plays as a striker. He is also a Nigerian international.

Club career
He joined Standard Liège in January 2012, making his debut on 19 February 2012, coming on as an 85th-minute substitute in the 4–2 loss to Zulte Waregem. On 2 July 2013, Ezekiel was awarded with an improved contract which will keep him at the club until 2017. On 31 July 2014 Ezekiel was transferred to Qatar Stars League club Al-Arabi for around 8 million euros. On 11 August 2018, Ezekiel joined Belgian First Division A side Kortrijk on a three-year deal.

International career
He received his first call-up to the Nigeria national team in February 2014. Ezekiel earned his first senior cap on 6 March, in the 0–0 draw with Mexico in a friendly match after coming on as a second-half substitute for Victor Moses.

He was selected by Nigeria for their 35-man provisional squad for the 2016 Summer Olympics.

Career statistics

Club

Honours
Nigeria U23
 Olympic Bronze Medal: 2016

Konyaspor
 Winner: 2017 Turkish Super Cup

Al Jazira
 Winner: 2020–21 UAE Pro League

	Standard Liège
 Runner-up: 2013–14 Belgian Pro League

References

External links
 

1993 births
Living people
Nigerian footballers
Nigeria international footballers
Nigerian expatriate footballers
Standard Liège players
Al-Arabi SC (Qatar) players
R.S.C. Anderlecht players
Konyaspor footballers
UD Las Palmas players
K.V. Kortrijk players
Al Jazira Club players
Al Dhafra FC players
Expatriate footballers in Belgium
Expatriate footballers in Qatar
Expatriate footballers in Turkey
Expatriate footballers in Spain
Belgian Pro League players
Qatar Stars League players
Süper Lig players
La Liga players
UAE Pro League players
Association football forwards
Nigerian expatriate sportspeople in Belgium
Nigerian expatriate sportspeople in Qatar
Nigerian expatriate sportspeople in Turkey
Nigerian expatriate sportspeople in Spain
Nigerian expatriate sportspeople in the United Arab Emirates
Expatriate footballers in the United Arab Emirates
Footballers at the 2016 Summer Olympics
Olympic footballers of Nigeria
Medalists at the 2016 Summer Olympics
Olympic bronze medalists for Nigeria
Olympic medalists in football
Sportspeople from Lagos